In differential geometry, the Frenet–Serret formulas describe the kinematic properties of a particle moving along a differentiable curve in three-dimensional Euclidean space , or the geometric properties of the curve itself irrespective of any motion.  More specifically, the formulas describe the derivatives of the so-called tangent, normal, and binormal unit vectors in terms of each other.  The formulas are named after the two French mathematicians who independently discovered them: Jean Frédéric Frenet, in his thesis of 1847, and Joseph Alfred Serret, in 1851.  Vector notation and linear algebra currently used to write these formulas were not yet available at the time of their discovery.

The tangent, normal, and binormal unit vectors, often called T, N, and B, or collectively the Frenet–Serret frame or TNB frame, together form an orthonormal basis spanning  and are defined as follows:
 T is the unit vector tangent to the curve, pointing in the direction of motion.
 N is the normal unit vector, the derivative of T with respect to the arclength parameter of the curve, divided by its length.
 B is the binormal unit vector, the cross product of T and N.
The Frenet–Serret formulas are:

where d/ds is the derivative with respect to arclength, κ is the curvature, and τ is the torsion of the curve. The two scalars κ and τ effectively define the curvature and torsion of a space curve.  The associated collection, T, N, B, κ, and τ, is called the Frenet–Serret apparatus.  Intuitively, curvature measures the failure of a curve to be a straight line, while torsion measures the failure of a curve to be planar.

Definitions

Let r(t) be a curve in Euclidean space, representing the position vector of the particle as a function of time.  The Frenet–Serret formulas apply to curves which are non-degenerate, which roughly means that they have nonzero curvature.  More formally, in this situation the velocity vector r′(t) and the acceleration vector r′′(t) are required not to be proportional.

Let s(t) represent the arc length which the particle has moved along the curve in time t.  The quantity s is used to give the curve traced out by the trajectory of the particle a natural parametrization by arc length (i.e. arc-length parametrization), since many different particle paths may trace out the same geometrical curve by traversing it at different rates.  In detail, s is given by

Moreover, since we have assumed that r′ ≠ 0, it follows that s(t) is a strictly monotonically increasing function.  Therefore, it is possible to solve for t as a function of s, and thus to write r(s) = r(t(s)).  The curve is thus parametrized in a preferred manner by its arc length.

With a non-degenerate curve r(s), parameterized by its arc length, it is now possible to define the Frenet–Serret frame (or TNB frame):
The tangent unit vector T is defined as
The normal unit vector N is defined as

from which it follows, since T always has unit magnitude, that N (the change of T) is always perpendicular to T, since there is no change in length of T. Note that by calling curvature  we automatically obtain the first relation.The binormal unit vector B is defined as the cross product of T and N:

from which it follows that B is always perpendicular to both T and N.  Thus, the three unit vectors T, N, and B are all perpendicular to each other.

The Frenet–Serret formulas are:

The Frenet–Serret formulas are also known as Frenet–Serret theorem, and can be stated more concisely using matrix notation:

This matrix is skew-symmetric.

Formulas in n dimensions 

The Frenet–Serret formulas were generalized to higher-dimensional Euclidean spaces by Camille Jordan in 1874.

The vectors in the Frenet–Serret frame are an orthonormal basis constructed by applying the Gram-Schmidt process to the vectors (r′(s), r′′(s), ..., r(n)(s)).

In detail, the unit tangent vector is the first Frenet vector e1(s) and is defined as

where

The normal vector, sometimes called the curvature vector, indicates the deviance of the curve from being a straight line. It is defined as

Its normalized form, the unit normal vector, is the second Frenet vector e2(s) and defined as

The tangent and the normal vector at point s define the osculating plane at point r(s).

The remaining vectors in the frame (the binormal, trinormal, etc.) are defined similarly by

The last vector in the frame is defined by the cross-product of the first  vectors:

The real valued functions used below χi(s) are called generalized curvature and are defined as

The Frenet–Serret formulas, stated in matrix language, are

Notice that as defined here, the generalized curvatures and the frame may differ slightly from the convention found in other sources.
The top curvature  (also called the torsion, in this context) and the last vector in the frame ,
differ by a sign

(the orientation of the basis) from the usual torsion.

Proof
Consider the 3 by 3 matrix

As a result, the transpose of Q is equal to the inverse of Q: Q is an orthogonal matrix. It suffices to show that

Note the first row of this equation already holds, by definition of the normal N and curvature κ, as well as the last row by the definition
of torsion. So it suffices to show that QT is a skew-symmetric matrix.  Since I = QQT, taking a derivative and applying the product rule yields

which establishes the required skew-symmetry.

Applications and interpretation

Kinematics of the frame 

The Frenet–Serret frame consisting of the tangent T, normal N, and binormal B collectively forms an orthonormal basis of 3-space.  At each point of the curve, this attaches a frame of reference or rectilinear coordinate system (see image).

The Frenet–Serret formulas admit a kinematic interpretation. Imagine that an observer moves along the curve in time, using the attached frame at each point as their coordinate system. The Frenet–Serret formulas mean that this coordinate system is constantly rotating as an observer moves along the curve.  Hence, this coordinate system is always non-inertial. The angular momentum of the observer's coordinate system is proportional to the Darboux vector of the frame.

Concretely, suppose that the observer carries an (inertial) top (or gyroscope) with them along the curve.  If the axis of the top points along the tangent to the curve, then it will be observed to rotate about its axis with angular velocity -τ relative to the observer's non-inertial coordinate system.  If, on the other hand, the axis of the top points in the binormal direction, then it is observed to rotate with angular velocity -κ.  This is easily visualized in the case when the curvature is a positive constant and the torsion vanishes.  The observer is then in uniform circular motion.  If the top points in the direction of the binormal, then by conservation of angular momentum it must rotate in the opposite direction of the circular motion.  In the limiting case when the curvature vanishes, the observer's normal precesses about the tangent vector, and similarly the top will rotate in the opposite direction of this precession.

The general case is illustrated below. There are further illustrations on Wikimedia.

Applications 
The kinematics of the frame have many applications in the sciences.
  In the life sciences, particularly in models of microbial motion, considerations of the Frenet–Serret frame have been used to explain the mechanism by which a moving organism in a viscous medium changes its direction.
 In physics, the Frenet–Serret frame is useful when it is impossible or inconvenient to assign a natural coordinate system for a trajectory.  Such is often the case, for instance, in relativity theory.  Within this setting, Frenet–Serret frames have been used to model the precession of a gyroscope in a gravitational well.

Graphical Illustrations

 Example of a moving Frenet basis (T in blue, N in green, B in purple) along Viviani's curve.

 On the example of a torus knot, the tangent vector T, the normal vector N, and the binormal vector B, along with the curvature κ(s), and the torsion τ(s) are displayed.  At the peaks of the torsion function the rotation of the Frenet–Serret frame (T,N,B) around the tangent vector is clearly visible.

 The kinematic significance of the curvature is best illustrated with plane curves (having constant torsion equal to zero). See the page on curvature of plane curves.

Frenet–Serret formulas in calculus 
The Frenet–Serret formulas are frequently introduced in courses on multivariable calculus as a companion to the study of space curves such as the helix.  A helix can be characterized by the height 2πh and radius r of a single turn.  The curvature and torsion of a helix (with constant radius) are given by the formulas
 
 

The sign of the torsion is determined by the right-handed or left-handed sense in which the helix twists around its central axis. Explicitly, the parametrization of a single turn of a right-handed helix with height 2πh and radius r is
 x = r cos t
 y = r sin t
 z = h t
 (0 ≤ t ≤ 2 π)
and, for a left-handed helix,
 x = r cos t
 y = −r sin t
 z = h t
 (0 ≤ t ≤ 2 π).

In his expository writings on the geometry of curves, Rudy Rucker employs the model of a slinky to explain the meaning of the torsion and curvature.  The slinky, he says, is characterized by the property that the quantity

remains constant if the slinky is vertically stretched out along its central axis.  (Here 2πh is the height of a single twist of the slinky, and r the radius.)  In particular, curvature and torsion are complementary in the sense that the torsion can be increased at the expense of curvature by stretching out the slinky.

Taylor expansion 
Repeatedly differentiating the curve and applying the Frenet–Serret formulas gives the following Taylor approximation to the curve near s = 0:

For a generic curve with nonvanishing torsion, the projection of the curve onto various coordinate planes in the T, N, B coordinate system at  have the following interpretations:

The osculating plane is the plane containing T and N.  The projection of the curve onto this plane has the form:This is a parabola up to terms of order o(s2), whose curvature at 0 is equal to κ(0).
The normal plane is the plane containing N and B.  The projection of the curve onto this plane has the form:which is a cuspidal cubic to order o(s3).
The rectifying plane is the plane containing T and B.  The projection of the curve onto this plane is:which traces out the graph of a cubic polynomial to order o(s3).

Ribbons and tubes 

The Frenet–Serret apparatus allows one to define certain optimal ribbons and tubes centered around a curve.  These have diverse applications in materials science and elasticity theory, as well as to computer graphics.

The Frenet ribbon along a curve C is the surface traced out by sweeping the line segment [−N,N] generated by the unit normal along the curve. This surface is sometimes confused with the tangent developable, which is the envelope E of the osculating planes of C. This is perhaps because both the Frenet ribbon and E exhibit similar properties along C. Namely, the tangent planes of both sheets of E, near the singular locus C where these sheets intersect, approach the osculating planes of C; the tangent planes of the Frenet ribbon along C are equal to these osculating planes. The Frenet ribbon is in general not developable.

Congruence of curves 
In classical Euclidean geometry, one is interested in studying the properties of figures in the plane which are invariant under congruence, so that if two figures are congruent then they must have the same properties. The Frenet–Serret apparatus presents the curvature and torsion as numerical invariants of a space curve.

Roughly speaking, two curves C and C′ in space are congruent if one can be rigidly moved to the other.  A rigid motion consists of a combination of a translation and a rotation.  A translation moves one point of C to a point of C′.  The rotation then adjusts the orientation of the curve C to line up with that of C′.  Such a combination of translation and rotation is called a Euclidean motion.  In terms of the parametrization r(t) defining the first curve C, a general Euclidean motion of C is a composite of the following operations:
 (Translation)  r(t) →  r(t) + v, where v is a constant vector.
 (Rotation)  r(t) + v → M(r(t) + v), where M is the matrix of a rotation.

The Frenet–Serret frame is particularly well-behaved with regard to Euclidean motions.  First, since T, N, and B can all be given as successive derivatives of the parametrization of the curve, each of them is insensitive to the addition of a constant vector to r(t).  Intuitively, the TNB frame attached to r(t) is the same as the TNB frame attached to the new curve .

This leaves only the rotations to consider.  Intuitively, if we apply a rotation M to the curve, then the TNB frame also rotates.  More precisely, the matrix Q whose rows are the TNB vectors of the Frenet–Serret frame changes by the matrix of a rotation

A fortiori, the matrix QT is unaffected by a rotation:

since  for the matrix of a rotation.

Hence the entries κ and τ of QT are invariants of the curve under Euclidean motions: if a Euclidean motion is applied to a curve, then the resulting curve has the same curvature and torsion.

Moreover, using the Frenet–Serret frame, one can also prove the converse: any two curves having the same curvature and torsion functions must be congruent by a Euclidean motion.  Roughly speaking, the Frenet–Serret formulas express the Darboux derivative of the TNB frame.  If the Darboux derivatives of two frames are equal, then a version of the fundamental theorem of calculus asserts that the curves are congruent.  In particular, the curvature and torsion are a complete set of invariants for a curve in three-dimensions.

Other expressions of the frame
The formulas given above for T, N, and B depend on the curve being given in terms of the arclength parameter.  This is a natural assumption in Euclidean geometry, because the arclength is a Euclidean invariant of the curve.  In the terminology of physics, the arclength parametrization is a natural choice of gauge. However, it may be awkward to work with in practice.  A number of other equivalent expressions are available.

Suppose that the curve is given by r(t), where the parameter t need no longer be arclength.  Then the unit tangent vector T may be written as

The normal vector N takes the form

The binormal B is then

An alternative way to arrive at the same expressions is to take the first three derivatives of the curve r′(t), r′′(t), r′′′(t), and to apply the Gram-Schmidt process.  The resulting ordered orthonormal basis is precisely the TNB frame.  This procedure also generalizes to produce Frenet frames in higher dimensions.

In terms of the parameter t, the Frenet–Serret formulas pick up an additional factor of ||r′(t)|| because of the chain rule:

Explicit expressions for the curvature and torsion may be computed. For example,

The torsion may be expressed using a scalar triple product as follows,

Special cases
If the curvature is always zero then the curve will be a straight line. Here the vectors N, B and the torsion are not well defined.

If the torsion is always zero then the curve will lie in a plane.

A curve may have nonzero curvature and zero torsion.  For example, the circle of radius R given by r(t)=(R cos t, R sin t, 0) in the z=0 plane has zero torsion and curvature equal to 1/R.  The converse, however, is false.  That is, a regular curve with nonzero torsion must have nonzero curvature.  (This is just the contrapositive of the fact that zero curvature implies zero torsion.)

A helix has constant curvature and constant torsion.

Plane curves

Given a curve contained on the x-y plane, its tangent vector T is also contained on that plane. Its binormal vector B can be naturally postulated to coincide with the normal to the plane (along the z axis). Finally, the curve normal can be found completing the right-handed system, N = B × T. This form is well-defined even when the curvature is zero; for example, the normal to a straight line in a plane will be perpendicular to the tangent, all co-planar.

See also

Affine geometry of curves
Differentiable curve
Darboux frame
Kinematics
Moving frame
Tangential and normal components

Notes

References
 
 
 . Abstract in Journal de Mathématiques Pures et Appliquées 17, 1852.
 .
.
 
 
 
 
 
 .
 .
 
 .

External links
Create your own animated illustrations of moving Frenet-Serret frames, curvature and torsion functions (Maple Worksheet)
Rudy Rucker's KappaTau Paper.
Very nice visual representation for the trihedron

Differential geometry
Multivariable calculus
Curves
Curvature (mathematics)